Gary M. Pomerantz (born November 17, 1960) is an American journalist and author who lectures in the graduate program in journalism at Stanford University. His books include Where Peachtree Meets Sweet Auburn (1996 New York Times Notable Book of the Year), a multi-generational biography of Atlanta, Georgia and its racial conscience, told through the families of Atlanta Mayors Maynard Jackson and Ivan Allen Jr., and The Last Pass: Cousy, Russell, the Celtics, and What Matters in the End (2018), a New York Times bestseller about race, regret and the storied Boston Celtics dynasty.

Early life
Pomerantz was born in North Tarrytown, New York, the youngest of three boys. His family moved to Orlando, Florida when he was a boy, and then to Los Angeles in 1971. He studied history at the University of California, Berkeley, graduating with BA in 1982. While at Berkeley, he served for a time as sports editor of the flagship student newspaper, The Daily Californian.

Career
Pomerantz worked as a daily journalist for nearly two decades. In 1981, he followed John Feinstein and Michael Wilbon as a summer intern in the sports department at The Washington Post. At the Post, he covered Georgetown University basketball and the National Football League. In 1987–1988, he served as a Journalism Fellow at the University of Michigan, studying theater and the Bible.  He then moved to The Atlanta Journal-Constitution where, for the next 11 years, he wrote social and political profiles, special projects, columns and served on the newspaper's editorial board.

His six nonfiction books feature a broad array of topics. Nine Minutes Twenty Seconds (2001), about the crash of Atlantic Southeast Airlines Flight 7529, was also published in China, Germany and Britain. In WILT, 1962 (2005), Pomerantz describes the night when basketball star Wilt Chamberlain scored 100 points in a game against the New York Knicks in Hershey, Pennsylvania. Named an "Editors' Choice" book by The New York Times, WILT, 1962 was described by Entertainment Weekly as "a meticulous and engaging narrative – a slam dunk of a read."

Where Peachtree Meets Sweet Auburn was optioned by independent studio wiip in fall 2021 and is currently in development for adaptation to television.

In 2017, author Malcolm Gladwell praised Where Peachtree Meets Sweet Auburn, telling Business Insider, "It's probably the best book I've read in quite some time.  It's an incredibly cool way to think about a city. I've always been fascinated by Atlanta, and I didn't really understand the city until I read that book . . . It's told so beautifully through these two families. It's really a remarkable book."
His book, Their Life's Work, about the Pittsburgh Steelers' football dynasty of the 1970s, short-listed for the 2014 PEN/ESPN Award for literary sportswriting.

From 1999 to 2001 Pomerantz served as distinguished visiting professor of journalism at Emory University in Atlanta. In 2007, he began lecturing at Stanford University, teaching courses on specialized reporting and writing.

Personal life

Pomerantz lives in the San Francisco Bay Area with his wife Carrie Schwab-Pomerantz, daughter of Charles R. Schwab.

Books
 
 
 
 
 
Pomerantz, Gary M. (2018). The Last Pass: Cousy, Russell, the Celtics, and What Matters in the End (1st ed.) Penguin Press.

See also
 Bridge Murder case

References

External links
 
Stanford University Department of Communication
"Their Life's Work" Interview, KD/PG Sunday Edition appearance on Pittsburgh television. (audio-video)
"Nine Minutes, Twenty Seconds" interview, CNN Sunday Morning (audio-video)
 "The Last Pass" interview with Bob Cousy, NPR (audio-video)
 
Stuart A. Rose Manuscript, Archives, and Rare Book Library: Gary M. Pomerantz papers, 1991-2005

1960 births
Living people
American male journalists
American non-fiction writers
Contract bridge writers
The Atlanta Journal-Constitution people
The Washington Post people
University of California, Berkeley alumni
University of Michigan alumni
Emory University faculty
Stanford University faculty 
University of Michigan fellows
People from Tarrytown, New York
20th-century American male writers
20th-century American journalists
20th-century American non-fiction writers
21st-century American male writers
21st-century American journalists
21st-century American non-fiction writers